Ken Ziffren (born 1940) is an American entertainment attorney. In 1978, he co-founded the Century City-based entertainment law firm  Ziffren Brittenham LLP. In 2014, Los Angeles mayor Eric Garcetti appointed Ziffren as the city's second "film czar" to advocate on behalf of the city to the state of California in regards to tax credits for in-state film production, taking the position over from the late Tom Sherak. As of 2021, he has remained in this role. 

A 1962 graduate of Northwestern University and a 1965 graduate of UCLA School of Law, Ziffren clerked for U.S. Supreme Court Chief Justice Earl Warren upon graduation from the latter. He has served as an adjunct faculty member at UCLA Law since 1998 and, in 2015, he donated $5M to the school to found the school's Ziffren Center for Media, Entertainment, Technology and Sports Law.

See also 
 List of law clerks of the Supreme Court of the United States (Chief Justice)

References

External links

Ziffren Brittenham LLP official website
UCLA Law faculty profile

American entertainment lawyers
Living people
1940 births
Northwestern University alumni
UCLA School of Law alumni
UCLA School of Law faculty
Law clerks of the Supreme Court of the United States